The 2017–18 European Rugby Challenge Cup pool stage was the first stage of the competition in the fourth season of the European Rugby Challenge Cup.

The competition involves twenty teams competing, across five pools of four teams, for eight quarter-final places – awarded to the five pool winners and the three top-ranked pool runners-up.

The pool stage began on 12 October 2017 and was completed on 20 January 2018.

Seeding
The twenty competing teams were seeded and split into four tiers; seeding was based on performance in their respective domestic leagues. Where promotion and relegation is in effect in a league, the promoted team was seeded last, or (if multiple teams are promoted) by performance in the lower competition.

Teams will be taken from a league in order of rank and put into a tier. A draw was used to allocate two second seeds to Tier 1; the remaining team went into Tier 2. This allocation indirectly determined which fourth-seeded team entered Tier 2, while the others entered Tier 3.

Given the nature of the Continental Shield, a competition including developing rugby nations and Italian clubs not competing in the Pro12, qualifying teams are automatically included in Tier 4, and are, in effect, seeded equally despite officially being ranked 1/2 from that competition.

The brackets show each team's seeding and their league (for example, 1 Top 14 indicates the team was seeded 1st from the Top 14).

Pool stage
The draw took place on 8 June 2017, in Neuchâtel, Switzerland.

Teams in the same pool play each other twice, both at home and away in the group stage, beginning on the weekend of 12/13/14 October 2017, and continuing through to 19/20 January 2018, before the pool winners and three best runners-up progressed to the quarter finals.

Teams are awarded competition points, based on match result. Teams receive 4 points for a win, 2 points for a draw, 1 attacking bonus point for scoring four or more tries in a match and 1 defensive bonus point for losing a match by seven points or fewer.

In the event of a tie between two or more teams, the following tie-breakers will be used, as directed by EPCR:
 Where teams have played each other
 The club with the greater number of competition points from only matches involving tied teams.
 If equal, the club with the best aggregate points difference from those matches.
 If equal, the club that scored the most tries in those matches.
 Where teams remain tied and/or have not played each other in the competition (i.e. are from different pools)
 The club with the best aggregate points difference from the pool stage.
 If equal, the club that scored the most tries in the pool stage.
 If equal, the club with the fewest players suspended in the pool stage.
 If equal, the drawing of lots will determine a club's ranking.

Pool 1

Pool 2

Pool 3

Pool 4

Pool 5

See also
2017–18 European Rugby Champions Cup

References

2017–18 European Rugby Challenge Cup
2017